Nada High School, is private, college-preparatory, boys school located in Kobe, Hyōgo Prefecture, Japan. Nada High School is well known for its severe entrance examination
and superior education especially in sciences. Nada High School has sent the largest number of its students to University of Tokyo, Kyoto University, and other top-tier medical universities in Japan. Nada High School also sends its graduates to prestigious universities abroad (Harvard University,University of Chicago, Princeton University, Cornell University, Washington University in St. Louis, etc.)

Nada High School offers courses in English, Mathematics, Science, History, Ethics, Political Science, Economics, and a range of electives. In addition, the school offers a concentration program in Judo. The Judo class during freshman year are intended to commemorate the founder of the school, Kanō Jigorō.

Nada High School also offers a range of extracurricular activities, including thirty-six interscholastic teams in sports, academic clubs, and student-run publications.

Establishment 
The School was found as Nada Middle School by the sake producers of Nada Ku region, Jiroemon Kano (Kiku-Masamune, now Kiku-Masamune Sake Brewing Co.,Ltd.), Jihē Kano (Hakutsuru, now Hakutsuru Sake Brewing Company Limited), and Tazaemon Yamamura (Sakuramasamune, now Sakuramasamune Company, Limited). See also Hakutsuru Fine Art Museum and Old Yamamura Residence.

Jigoro Kano, father of Judo born in this Kano family in the town of Mikage (now within Higashinada-ku, Kobe), also helped establish Nada Middle High School. In 1928 he gave a speech to first batch students at Nada Middle School. See also Kanō Jigorō#Professional life.

Ranking and Reputation 
Every year, Nada High School receives over 140 applications for 40 Class positions. A considerable number of students from Tokyo and Kyushu attempt Nada's entrance examination to see how they are. The Nada ranks number one amongst private high schools in Japan.

Nada High School completes the national curriculum by junior year. The last year is devoted to intense review and preparation for the university entrance exam. Nada High School excels especially in Mathematics, Chemistry, Physics and Biology. Students of Nada High School often receive Gold Medals for international science olympiads. In total they have won 8 Gold Medals in international science olympiads. Many alumni of Nada High School succeeded as scholars including Ryōji Noyori, a Nobel laureate of Chemistry in 2001. Nada High School has traditionally created many well-known writers as well, including Shusaku Endo, Ramo Nakajima, Genichiro Takahashi etc.

School regulations are minimal.  There are no school uniforms and no rules regarding possessions since the 1970s, when students mobilized themselves to protest against such rules.

Nada Junior High School
Nada Junior High School is the affiliate school of Nada High School. It has 180 students per grade, and these students go Nada High School unconditionally after they graduate Nada Junior High School.

Nada Junior High School is known as well as Nada High School for its severe entrance exam. Every year, Nada Junior High School receives more than 500 applications.

The curriculum of Nada Junior High School is continuous to that of Nada High School, and students of Nada Junior High School are usually taught by the same teachers for 6 years from their entrance of Nada Junior High School to their graduation of Nada High School.

Nada High School and Nada Junior High School are located in the same site and share many facilities. 
Many of club activities (except sport teams) are for both high school students and junior high school students, and the student government is also unified.
So it can be said that students from Nada Junior High School go to the same school for 6 years.

Access
Get off at Sumiyoshi Station (JR West / Kobe New Transit) and walk east for about 10 minutes.

Get off at Uozaki Station (Hanshin Main Line, Rokko Liner) and walk north for about 10 minutes.

Get off at Okamoto Station (Hankyu Kōbe Main Line) and walk southwest for about 25 minutes.

Notable alumni 

 Kan Suzuki, member of Parliament
 Kamon Iizumi, member of Parliament
 Kozo Hirabayashi, member of Parliament
 Jyuntaro Toyota, member of Parliament
 Yasuhiro Tsuji, member of Parliament
 Takeshi Nishida, member of Parliament
 Yasutoshi Nishimura, member of Parliament
 Teru Fukui, member of Parliament
 Masahito Moriyama, member of Parliament
 Yoshizumi Asano, head of Fuji Television
 Soichi Takabatake, CEO of Teijin.Co
 Kiyotaka Fuji, Louis Vuitton Japan Company president & CEO
 Masafumi Miyamoto, founder of SQUARE CO., LTD
 Ryōji Noyori, Nobel laureate of Chemistry in 2001
 Shusaku Endo, writer, Akutagawa Prize winner
 Ramo Nakajima, writer
 Genichiro Takahashi, writer
 Masahiko Katsuya, columnist, journalist
 Toshiyuki Kobayashi, mathematician

See also
Secondary education in Japan
Higher education in Japan

References

External links 
 
 

High schools in Hyōgo Prefecture
Educational institutions established in 1928
Registered Monuments of Japan
Schools in Hyōgo Prefecture
1928 establishments in Japan
Boys' schools in Japan